is a Japanese football player. He plays for ReinMeer Aomori on loan from Fukushima United FC.

Career
Yuki Hashimoto joined J3 League club Fukushima United FC in 2017.

Club statistics
Updated to 26 August 2018.

References

External links

Profile at Fukushima United FC

1994 births
Living people
Chukyo University alumni
Association football people from Kanagawa Prefecture
Japanese footballers
J3 League players
Japan Football League players
Fukushima United FC players
ReinMeer Aomori players
Association football midfielders